The Richmond Progressive Alliance (RPA) is a community/political group in Richmond, western Contra Costa County, California, United States. Its mission is to unite the left regardless of political party and was founded by Gayle McLaughlin and Marilyn Langlois. 

It supports various community efforts including campaigns to force the local Chevron refinery to pay higher taxes and reduce pollution; opposition to racial profiling; and opposition to urban casino development in Point Molate. It supports candidates for the nonpartisan races in the city. 

Its members include voters registered in the Democratic, Green, and other parties as well as independents. During the 2000s and 2010s, the alliance altered the balance of power in the city and reduced the representation of Chevron-backed candidates. When interviewed, McLaughlin stated that the RPA was designed as, "an umbrella organization to bring together Greens, progressive Democrats, libertarians, Peace and Freedom Party members and others who are concerned about Richmond community affairs." The RPA is credited with "extracting" 114 million dollars on one occasion and another 90 million on a second occasion to fund social programs.

Andrés Soto
Andrés Soto) is an environmentalist and activist from Richmond and one of the founders of the organization. He works for Communities for a Better Environment and is a critic of the pollution caused by the Chevron Richmond Refinery.

He criticized the notion that the Richmond Refinery brings jobs to Richmond with the statistic that only 5% of its employees are Richmond residents in 2012.

He lobbied for Chevron to financially support struggling Doctors Medical Center in 2014 unsuccessfully, citing that it was a backbone for treatment during the refinery's periodic chemical spills.

In 2016 he was campaigning for lower refinery emissions.

In the year 2018 he opposed the settlement that went on to approve a master planned community at the former Point Molate Naval Fuel Depot. Also in that year he opposed the exporting of coal and petcoke to Latin American and Asian markets through the Port of Richmond.

In 2019 he supported banning the transport of coal from Utah to the Levin Terminal for export due to off-gassing from coal dust and its potential harm to the community. He also criticized the Richmond City Council of being too close to Big Oil. Furthermore he has stated that there is too much pollution located in toxic pockets of Pittsburg, California which he believes are associated with high levels of asthma an cardiovascular disease intersected with a community of African Americans and Latinx Americans living in poverty.

2004 through 2005
In the 2004 election Gayle McLaughlin won the race for a city council seat in Richmond while Andrés Soto lost his bid for city council and Leonard McNeil won his campaign for San Pablo mayor, all running as part of the Richmond Progressive Alliance.

In 2005 the RPA supported transfer of the former Zeneca site at Campus Bay to the California Department of Toxic Substances Control.

2006 through 2007

In 2006 Gayle McLaughlin won the election for mayor as a Green Party member versus incumbent Democrat Irma Anderson by 189 votes out around 12,000 cast. Jim Jenkins lost his bid for the Richmond city council.

2008 through 2009
Measure T, a ballot measure submitted to the voters that substantially increased business license fees for large corporations like Chevron Corporation owner of the Chevron Richmond Refinery passed. Jovanka Beckles ran for city council of Richmond and lost while Jeff Ritterman won his city council bid. Another ballot measure, Measure U, in favor of casinos, like the one proposed for the former Point Molate Naval Fuel Depot, was successfully defeated at the ballot box.

2010 through 2011
In 2010, the RPA negotiated with Chevron to contribute millions of dollars for the city to reinvest in itself instead of facing Measure T which would have forced a change in the utility tax which would have made them potentially contribute more. In this same year Gayle McLaughlin won re-election as Richmond mayor. Jovanka Beckles in her second bid for Richmond city council won while Eduardo Martinez lost his second attempt at a spot on the Richmond city council.

2012 through 2013
In the 2012 election, Langlois lost a run for city council, as did Eduardo Martinez on his third bid. In that same election, Measure N, a tax on sugary drinks written by RPA member Dr. Jeff Ritterman, was resoundingly rejected by voters amid $2.4 million in campaign spending by Community Coalition Against Beverage Taxes, a campaign expenditure group funded by the American Beverage Association, to defeat it.

2014 through 2015

In 2014, RPA member Mike Parker ran for Richmond mayor but withdrew from the race in August. Parker endorsed fellow candidate and city councilmember Tom Butt so as not to splinter the progressive and moderate-progressive vote in the election. Seen as a "David versus Goliath" race in the wake of the 2010 Citizens United Supreme Court case, the 2014 Richmond municipal election attracted national media attention  due to Chevron spending approximately $3 million to support its own slate of candidates and break progressive control of the council. Butt beat Chevron's mayoral candidate, Nat Bates, with more than 51 percent of the election and avoiding a run-off. Martinez and Beckles also for won their bids, beating out Chevon-backed candidates Donna Powers, Charles Ramsey, and Al Martinez, while ex-mayor Gayle McLaughlin also won back a seat.

2016 through 2017
In 2016, RPA members Ben Choi and Melvin Willis won seats on the Richmond City Council, joining McLaughlin, Beckles, and Martinez on the board and giving the RPA a majority on the seven-member city council. Neither Choi, an account manager with a clean-energy company, nor Willis, a community organizer, had held elected office prior to the election. In that same election, Richmond voters approved a controversial rent-control and just-cause eviction measure written and backed by the RPA.

2018 to present

In 2018, Richmond's mayor, Tom Butt, endorsed Buffy Wicks, who opposed Beckles in the race for District 15's California Assembly seat. Beckles was endorsed by the California Progressive Alliance, a statewide offshoot of the Richmond Progressive Alliance co-founded by McLaughlin to elevate progressive ideas statewide. Wicks went on to beat Beckles by 12 points and win the seat.  Pundits cited her win over the RPA was due, in part, to Wicks' own experience with grassroots organizing, beating Beckles at her "own game." In the same election, McLaughlin lost her race for California Lieutenant Governor.

In 2019, Butt blamed the Richmond Progressive Alliance for obstructing appointments to city positions, which are done typically at the prerogative of the mayor.

References

External links
Richmond Progressive Alliance official website

Organizations based in the San Francisco Bay Area
Richmond, California